Viken is a Norwegian surname that may refer to
 Gunnar Viken (born 1948), Norwegian conservative politician
Jeffrey L. Viken (born 1952), American judge
 Tore Viken Holvik (born 1988), Norwegian snowboarder
 Tove Kari Viken (1942–2016), politician of the Norwegian Centre Party

Norwegian-language surnames